The 2023 Houston Roughnecks season is the second season for the Houston Roughnecks as a professional American football franchise. They are charter members of the XFL, one of eight teams to compete in the league for the 2023 season. The Roughnecks will play their home games at the TDECU Stadium and be led by head coach Wade Phillips.

Schedule
All times Central

Game Summaries

Week 1: vs. Orlando Guardians

Week 2: vs. Arlington Renegades

Week 3: vs. San Antonio Brahmas

Week 4: at Orlando Guardians

Week 5: at Seattle Sea Dragons

Week 6: at DC Defenders

Standings

Staff

Roster

References

Houston
Houston Roughnecks
Houston Roughnecks